Pedro Ramón Martínez Reyes (born 1991) is a Venezuelan chess player. He was awarded the title of FIDE Master in 2014.

Chess career

Martínez represented Venezuela in the Chess Olympiad in 2012, where he scored 3/6 on first reserve.
 
He qualified for the Chess World Cup 2021, where he was defeated 2-0 by Shant Sargsyan in the first round.

References

External links

Pedro Ramon Martinez Reyes chess games at 365Chess.com

1991 births
Living people
Venezuelan chess players
Chess Olympiad competitors
Chess FIDE Masters